Marina International School is an international school in the Banjul area of the Gambia. It serves levels PreK–12.

Historically, the school served Gambian and non-Gambian students, with different tuition rates for non-Gambian students with parents working for international agencies, Gambian students, and other non-Gambian students.
A grant by the federal government of the United States was discontinued in 1984 when the Banjul American Embassy School (BAES) was established. American parents had paid high tuition dollars to Marina but got little power in the school's management. Currently, it serves as one of the best prestigious schools in The Gambia.

See also

 Education in the Gambia
 List of international schools
 List of schools in the Gambia

References

External links
 Marina International School

Educational institutions with year of establishment missing
American international schools in Africa
Buildings and structures in Banjul
Elementary and primary schools in the Gambia
International high schools
International schools in the Gambia
High schools and secondary schools in the Gambia